Richard F. Ralph (August 31, 1869 - October 2, 1949) was an American politician from Valley Park, Missouri, who served in the Missouri Senate as Republican floor.  He was elected as prosecuting attorney for St. Louis County, Missouri in 1914, 1916, and 1918.  Ralph was educated in the public schools of Alton, Illinois, and the Benton College of Law in St. Louis.

References

1869 births
1949 deaths
Missouri lawyers
Republican Party Missouri state senators
People from New Boston, New Hampshire
Politicians from St. Louis County, Missouri